Setiawan Djody (born 13 March 1949; Solo, Central Java, Indonesia) is an Indonesian businessman and guitarist.

Life 
Djody was a Wharton School graduate in 1974 and got the S-2 Philosophy from the University of California, Berkeley.

He is the chairman of Setdco Group in Indonesia, Setdco being named after his own name. He is also a musician, being listed by Rolling Stone as one of Asia's top guitarists.

The majority of its investments are in the oil, media and agricultural industries, including telecommunications. He is listed as one of the 150 richest Indonesians by Forbes 2007 magazine. He is also active in the business of shipping and has several shipping companies.

Personal life 
Djody received a liver transplantation donor from daughter Shri Jehan Djody, but in May 2011 he has made Kantata Barock concert.

References

Indonesian businesspeople
Indonesian guitarists
Living people
1949 births
Wharton School of the University of Pennsylvania alumni
University of California, Berkeley alumni
Liver transplant recipients
People from Surakarta